Raḥmatu'lláh Muhájir (‎; 4 April 19231979) was a prominent fourth-generation Baháʼí, born in ʻAbdu'l-'Azím, Iran.

In 1954, Muhájir married Írán Furútan, the daughter of ʻAlí-Akbar Furútan and together they pioneered to the Mentawai Islands of Indonesia. For their service in responding to the calls of the Ten Year Crusade, they were both named as Knights of Baháʼu'lláh by Shoghi Effendi in March 1954. By the time he left the Mentawi Islands in 1958, Raḥmat Muhájir's teaching efforts in the Mentawi Islands had helped to establish 12 Baháʼí schools, 33 local Spiritual Assemblies and around 4,000 believers on Siberut Island.

Muhájir was elected as a member of the Regional Spiritual Assembly in 1957. In October that year, he was appointed a Hand of the Cause of God by Shoghi Effendi. In 1958, he and his family left Indonesia to travel all over the world, inspiring mass teaching campaigns in several countries. He died in Ecuador in 1979.

References

External links 
BWNS: Heroic life inspires conference
Rahmatu'llah Muhajir: Hand of the Cause of God - the Treasure of All Humanity by Richard Francis (1998).
Raḥmatu'lláh Muhájir, photograph at the Baháʼí Media Bank.

Muhajir, Rahmatu'llah
Muhajir, Rahmatu'llah
1979 deaths
20th-century Bahá'ís
1923 births
Knights of Bahá'u'lláh
Iranian expatriates in Indonesia